General Sykes may refer to:

Frederick Sykes (1877–1954), Royal Air Force major general
George Sykes (1822–1880), Union Army major general
Matthew Sykes (born 1955), British Army major general
Percy Sykes (1867–1945), British Indian Army brigadier general